Eagar is a town in Apache County, Arizona, United States. As of the 2010 census, the population of the town was 4,885.

Eagar was first settled in 1871.

History
Brothers William Walter John Thomas and Joel Sixtus settled the area under the direction of The Mormon prophet Brigham Young. They each acquired 160 acres of land under the homestead act. Once they received the deeds to their properties, again under the direction of Brigham Young, they each subdivided their properties to sell at a discounted rate to other church members who were also settling the area. 

The first postmistress, Emma Goldsbrough Udall, wanted to name the town "Union", in a desire for eventually combining the town with other towns such as Amity and Springerville, to unite the small community.  However, the US postmaster general rejected the name as too common.  Therefore, she submitted the name "Eagarville" to honor the Eagar brothers.  However, that name was also changed by the postmaster general to just "Eagar" sometime before December 1892 when the school district was renamed.

A battle took place near what is now the town cemetery in which 9 members of the Snyder gang were killed.

The town of Eagar was incorporated in 1948.

Geography
Eagar is located in southern Apache County, just north of Apache National Forest and at the foot of the White Mountains.

The town of Springerville borders Eagar to the north.

Climate
This region experiences warm (but not hot) and dry summers, with no average monthly temperatures above 71.6 °F.  According to the Köppen Climate Classification system, Eagar has a warm-summer Mediterranean climate, abbreviated "Csb" on climate maps.

Demographics

As of the census of 2000, there were 4,033 people, 1,344 households, and 1,073 families residing in the town. The racial makeup of the town was 87.1% White, 3.4% Native American, 0.4% Black or African American, 0.1% Asian, 0.4% Pacific Islander, 4.9% from other races, and 3.8% from two or more races.  14.0% of the population were Hispanic or Latino of any race.

There were 1,344 households, out of which 45.7% had children under the age of 18 living with them, 65.5% were married couples living together, 11.4% had a female householder with no husband present, and 20.1% were non-families. 17.3% of all households were made up of individuals, and 7.3% had someone living alone who was 65 years of age or older.  The average household size was 2.99 and the average family size was 3.38.

In the town, the age distribution of the population shows 36.2% under the age of 18, 7.6% from 18 to 24, 23.5% from 25 to 44, 23.5% from 45 to 64, and 9.2% who were 65 years of age or older.  The median age was 33 years. For every 100 females, there were 95.7 males.  For every 100 females age 18 and over, there were 91.8 males.

The median income for a household in the town was $37,378, and the median income for a family was $41,250. Males had a median income of $36,111 versus $21,274 for females. The per capita income for the town was $14,623.  About 7.8% of families and 7.4% of the population were below the poverty line, including 5.8% of those under age 18 and 10.0% of those age 65 or over.

Arts and culture
The Apache County Library District operates the Round Valley Public Library in Eagar.

Two sites are listed on the National Register of Historic Places, including, Colter Ranch, once one of the largest cattle operations in Northeastern Arizona, and Eagar Elementary School, built after the original frame school house burned in 1930.  The building served as a school for 53 years.

Government
The current town mayor is Bryce Hamblin. The town is home to the first enclosed high school football field, the Round Valley Ensphere.

Education
The town is served by Round Valley Unified School District.

The town is served by three neighborhood schools: Round Valley Elementary School, Round Valley Middle School, and Round Valley High School.

In addition, White Mountain Academy, a K–12 charter school, is located in Eagar.

Notable people
 Joseph Isaac (Ike) Clanton (1847–1887), member of the Cowboys
 Milton William Cooper, conspiracy theorist (UFOs and Illuminati)
 Don Taylor Udall, state legislator and judge
 Jesse Addison Udall, state legislator and chief justice of the Arizona Supreme Court
 Joseph Udall (1860–1943), early settler, served on the Apache County Board of Supervisors for nearly 20 years

See also

 List of cities and towns in Arizona
 Transfer Station Fire

References

External links

 
 History of Eagar

White Mountains (Arizona)
Towns in Apache County, Arizona
Populated places established in 1871
1871 establishments in Arizona Territory